Bryan Murphy (born 1993) is an Irish hurler.

Bryan Murphy may also refer to:
Bryan Murphy (Gaelic footballer) (born 1967), Irish Gaelic football manager and dual player of hurling and Gaelic football
Bryan Murphy (athlete) represented Ireland at the 2006 European Athletics Championships
Bryan Murphy (American football), played in 2008 Boston College Eagles football team

See also
Brian Murphy (disambiguation)